Dennis Allen may refer to:

Dennis Allen (American football) (born 1972), American football coach and current head coach of the New Orleans Saints in the NFL
Dennis Allen (criminal) (1951–1987), Australian drug dealer 
Dennis Allen (footballer) (1939–1995), English association football player and manager
Dennis Allen (TV comedian) (1940–1995)

See also
Denis Allen (disambiguation)
Allen (surname)